Southport Carriage Sidings are located in Southport, Merseyside, England, at the wye of the Northern Line and the Manchester–Southport line, near Southport station.

Present
They provide stabling for Merseyrail Class 507 and Class 508 EMUs.

References

 Railway sidings in England